= List of microcars by country of origin: T =

== List ==
Country	Automobile Name	Manufacturer	Engine Make/Capacity	Seats	Year	Other information
Taiwan	Cub Commuter	Swi Tong Corporation	400cc	2	1982	Made in Taiwan for the US market
